Diepoxybutane (also known as butane diepoxide, butadiene diepoxide, or 1,2:3,4-diepoxybutane) is an epoxide which is a colorless liquid at room temperature. It is therefore highly reactive, more than other ethers. An epoxide is a cyclic ether that contains a three atom ring that comes close to an equilateral triangle. The primary structure of an epoxide contains two carbon atoms and a hydrocarbon attached to an oxygen atom. It polymerizes in the presence of catalysts or when heated. It’s hydrophilic, very flammable and easily ignited by heat or sparks.

Diepoxybutane is used as a chemical intermediate, as a curing agent for polymers, as a cross-linking agent for textiles, and as a preservative.

Structure, reactivity, synthesis 
Diepoxybutane occurs in several enantiomeric forms, including d,l-1,2:3,4-diepoxybutane, d-1,2:3,4- diepoxybutane, l-1,2:3,4-diepoxybutane, and meso-1,2:3,4-diepoxybutane.

Diepoxybutane polymerizes in the presence of catalysts or when heated. These polymerization reactions can be violent. Compounds in epoxy groups react with acids, bases, and oxidizing and reducing agents. They react, possibly violently with water in the presence of acid and other catalysts.

Metabolism/biotransformation 
The metabolism/biotransformation of diepoxybutane occurs in several steps. The first biotransformation step is the cytochrome p450-mediated oxidation of 1,3-butadiene to form 3,4-epoxy-1-butene (EB). EB can be further metabolized into 1,2,3,4-diepoxybutane (DEB) or into 3-butene-1,2-diol (BDD). The hydrolysis of DEB by epoxide hydrolase or the oxidation of BDD by cytochrome p450 produces 3,4-epoxy-1,2-butanediol (EBD).

Efficacy and side effects

Efficacy 
Diepoxybutane is primarily used for research purposes. In research it is used as a curing agent for polymer resins, as a cross-linking agent for making synthetic textile fibers, and as a chemical intermediate. There is a diepoxybutane test (DEB) for clinical investigation, used to screen for Fanconi anemia (FA) among patients with bone marrow failure syndromes. FA is regarding chromosomal instability, which is why the cross-linking feature of DEB is useful for diagnosis.

Adverse effects 

 Dermatoxin - Skin burns.
 Toxic Pneumonitis - Inflammation of the lungs induced by inhalation of metal fumes or toxic gasses and vapors.

Carcinogenicity 

 IARC Carcinogen - Class 1: International Agency for Research on Cancer classifies chemicals as established human carcinogens.
 NTP Carcinogen - Reasonably anticipated to be a human carcinogen.

Molecular mechanism of action 
Diepoxybutane is the most potent active metabolite of the environmental chemical 1,3-butadiene (BD), which is widely used as an industrial chemical. BD is known to be a mutagen and human carcinogen and is capable of organ toxicity. The exposure, primarily via inhalation or dermal contact, of diepoxybutane to a human induces apoptosis in TK6 lymphoblasts via the upregulation of the tumor-suppressor p53 protein.

Toxicity

Effect on humans 
Diepoxybutane is reasonably anticipated to be a human carcinogen based on evidence of carcinogenicity in experimental animals. Carcinogen is an agent capable of causing cancer. Many scientists believe there is no safe level of exposure to a carcinogen .

1,2:3,4-diepoxybutane can affect humans when breathed in, this agent can irritate the nose, throat and lungs causing coughing and/or shortness of breath (bronchitis). Longer exposure periods can cause build-up of fluid in the lungs (pulmonary edem)), a medical emergency, with severe shortness of breath. It may also damage the liver and kidneys. It should be handled as a carcinogen with extreme care .

Effect on animals 
It is experimentally shown that diepoxybutane can cause tumors in rodent species at several different tissue sites and by several different exposure routes. Dermal contact with diepoxybutane caused benign but also malignant skin tumors in mice. Injection of diepoxybutane into mice and rats caused lung tumors. Furthermore, the inhalation exposure to diepoxybutane caused benign Harderian-gland tumors in mice and also increased the area of benign or malignant tumors of the nasal cavity.

See also 
 Ethyl methanesulfonate

References

Epoxides
Carcinogens